David Warthen (born December 10, 1957) was one of the founders of Ask Jeeves, now called Ask.com, an internet search engine. Warthen has served as Chief Technology Officer or Vice President of Engineering for a variety of companies, many of them start-ups, over his career.

David Warthen obtained B.A (Computer Science) from University of California, San Diego, and attended PhD program at University of California, Berkeley (2002 - 2004) but did not obtain a degree.

References

External links
Ask Jeeves Background
UCSD Alumni Magazine article 
Innovation and Technology Magazine Bio
Carlsbad Magazine Bio

1957 births
Living people
American technology company founders
American corporate directors
University of California, San Diego alumni
American chief technology officers